Czech Film Critics' Awards are annual awards that recognize accomplishments in filmmaking and television. Awards were established in 2010 as alternative to Czech Lion Awards. Awards are organised by Association of Czech Film Critics.

Categories
Best film
Best documentary
Best director
Best screenplay
Best actress
Best actor
Best audiovisual work
Best television title
Innology Award – Discovery of the Year

Best film winners

References

 
Czech film awards
Awards established in 2010
2010 establishments in the Czech Republic